The Arbitration Act 1996 (c 23) is an Act of Parliament which regulates arbitration proceedings within the jurisdiction of England and Wales and Northern Ireland.

The 1996 Act only applies to parts of the United Kingdom.  In Scotland, the Arbitration (Scotland) Act 2010  provides a modern statutory framework for domestic and international arbitration.

Overview
England and Wales is one of the very few developed jurisdictions in the world which has consciously elected not to follow the UNCITRAL Model Law on International Commercial Arbitration.  This is a position which has been subject to criticism.

General duty of the tribunal

The Act mandates that the general duty of the arbitral tribunal is to:
 act fairly and impartially as between the parties, giving each party a reasonable opportunity of putting his case and dealing with that of his opponent, and
 adopt procedures suitable to the circumstances of the particular case, avoiding unnecessary delay or expense, so as to provide a fair means for the resolution of the matters falling to be determined.
The various subsequent provisions relating to the conduct of arbitrations are largely pinned upon this overriding duty.  The legislation specifies that "The tribunal shall comply with that general duty in conducting the arbitral proceedings, in its decisions on matters of procedure and evidence and in the exercise of all other powers conferred on it."

Subject to that overriding duty, the tribunal has broad discretion in relation to matters of procedure and evidence. The legislation provides that "It shall be for the tribunal to decide all procedural and evidential matters, subject to the right of the parties to agree any matter."

Procedural and evidential matters include:
 when and where any part of the proceedings is to be held;
 the language or languages to be used in the proceedings and whether translations of any relevant documents are to be supplied;
 whether any and if so what form of written statements of claim and defence are to be used, when these should be supplied and the extent to which such statements can be later amended;
 whether any and if so which documents or classes of documents should be disclosed between and produced by the parties and at what stage;
 whether any and if so what questions should be put to and answered by the respective parties and when and in what form this should be done;
 whether to apply strict rules of evidence (or any other rules) as to the admissibility, relevance or weight of any material (oral, written or other) sought to be tendered on any matters of fact or opinion, and the time, manner and form in which such material should be exchanged and presented;
 whether and to what extent the tribunal should itself take the initiative in ascertaining the facts and the law; and
 whether and to what extent there should be oral or written evidence or submissions.

The Act also imposes a duty on the parties to "do all things necessary for the proper and expeditious conduct of the arbitral proceedings."

Stay of legal proceedings
If any legal proceedings are commenced against a party which are subject to an arbitration agreement, then the party may apply to the court for a stay of those legal proceedings, and the Act provides that the court "shall grant a stay unless [it is] satisfied that the arbitration agreement is null and void, inoperative, or incapable of being performed."  However this provision does not apply to a domestic arbitration agreement. In such cases the court has a wider discretion whether or not to grant a stay including whether there are "other sufficient grounds" for not requiring the parties to abide by the arbitration agreement.

Exclusion of the courts

Section 69 permits an appeal on a point of law to a court unless the parties have agreed to exclude that right. But the right to bring an appeal may only be exercised either with the agreement of the other party, or with the leave of the court. An agreement by the parties to dispense with the requirement to give reasons for the tribunal's award is treated as an agreement to exclude the court's jurisdiction to hear an appeal on a point of law.

Challenging the award
Under the Act there are broadly only two ways in which an arbitration award may be challenged (apart from appeal on a point of law):
 Challenging the substantive jurisdiction under section 67; or
 Seeking to set aside the award for serious irregularity under section 68.

The Act defines serious irregularity as one or more of the following which the court considers has caused or will cause "substantial injustice" to the applicant:
 failure by the tribunal to comply with section 33 (general duty of tribunal);
 the tribunal exceeding its powers (otherwise than by exceeding its substantive jurisdiction);
 failure by the tribunal to conduct the proceedings in accordance with the procedure agreed by the parties;
 failure by the tribunal to deal with all the issues that were put to it;
 any arbitral or other institution or person vested by the parties with powers in relation to the proceedings or the award exceeding its powers;
 uncertainty or ambiguity as to the effect of the award;
 the award being obtained by fraud or the award or the way in which it was procured being contrary to public policy;
 failure to comply with the requirements as to the form of the award; or
 any irregularity in the conduct of the proceedings or in the award which is admitted by the tribunal or by any arbitral or other institution or person vested by the parties with powers in relation to the proceedings or the award.

Any challenge to an award must be brought within 28 days of the arbitrator's decision, or notification of the outcome of any arbitral appeal or review. According to Lord Justice Popplewell, "this relatively short period of time reflects the principle of speedy finality which underpins the Act". Where "the interests of justice require an exceptional departure" from this timescale, an extension of time may be allowed. In 2012, Popplewell set out the factors which will influence a court's decision on whether to grant an extension of time as:
the length of the delay;
whether the party who permitted the time limit to expire and subsequently delayed was acting reasonably in the circumstances in doing so;
whether the respondent to the application or the arbitrator caused or contributed to the delay;
whether the respondent to the application would by reason of the delay suffer irremediable prejudice in addition to the mere loss of time if the application were permitted to proceed;
whether the arbitration has continued during the period of delay and, if so, what impact on the progress of the arbitration, or the costs incurred in respect of the arbitration, the determination of the application by the Court might now have;
the strength of the application;
whether in the broadest sense it would be unfair to the applicant for him to be denied the opportunity of having the application determined.
The first three points are "the primary factors".

Recognition of foreign awards
Recognition of foreign awards is addressed in Part III of the statute.

Section 99 provides that Part II of the Arbitration Act 1950, which deals with enforcement of non-New York Convention awards shall continue to apply to such awards.

The remainder of the part deals with the enforcement of awards from contracting states to the New York Convention.  Those provisions broadly replicate the architecture of the Convention, and provide that such an award shall only be refused on the ground specified in the Convention, specifically:
 that a party to the arbitration agreement was (under the law applicable to him) under some incapacity;
 that the arbitration agreement was not valid under the law to which the parties subjected it or, failing any indication thereon, under the law of the country where the award was made;
 that he was not given proper notice of the appointment of the arbitrator or of the arbitration proceedings or was otherwise unable to present his case;
 that the award deals with a difference not contemplated by or not falling within the terms of the submission to arbitration or contains decisions on matters beyond the scope of the submission to arbitration (but see subsection (4));
 that the composition of the arbitral tribunal or the arbitral procedure was not in accordance with the agreement of the parties or, failing such agreement, with the law of the country in which the arbitration took place;
 that the award has not yet become binding on the parties, or has been set aside or suspended by a competent authority of the country in which, or under the law of which, it was made; or
 if the award is in respect of a matter which is not capable of settlement by arbitration, or if it would be contrary to public policy to recognise or enforce the award.

See also

UK commercial law
UK labour law
Advisory, Conciliation and Arbitration Service
Alternative dispute resolution
International arbitration
International commercial law
UNCITRAL Model Law on International Commercial Arbitration
International Court of Arbitration
Arbitration in the United States
Industrial Conciliation and Arbitration Act 1894, a New Zealand labour law Act
Conciliation and Arbitration Act 1904, an Australian labour law Act

Notes

Text of the Act is licensed under the Open Government Licence v3.0 (OGL v.3).

External links
Full text on OPSI

Arbitration
Arbitration law
United Kingdom labour law
United Kingdom Acts of Parliament 1996